In probability theory and statistics, the Van Houtum distribution is a discrete probability distribution named after prof. Geert-Jan van Houtum. It can be characterized by saying that all values of a finite set of possible values are equally probable, except for the smallest and largest element of this set. Since the Van Houtum distribution is a generalization of the discrete uniform distribution, i.e. it is uniform except possibly at its boundaries, it is sometimes also referred to as quasi-uniform.

It is regularly the case that the only available information concerning some discrete random variable are its first two moments. The Van Houtum distribution can be used to fit a distribution with finite support on these moments.

A simple example of the Van Houtum distribution arises when throwing a loaded dice which has been tampered with to land on a 6 twice as often as on a 1. The possible values of the sample space are 1, 2, 3, 4, 5 and 6. Each time the die is thrown, the probability of throwing a 2, 3, 4 or 5 is 1/6; the probability of a 1 is 1/9 and the probability of throwing a 6 is 2/9.

Probability mass function
A random variable U has a Van Houtum (a, b, pa, pb) distribution if its probability mass function is

Fitting procedure
Suppose a random variable  has mean  and squared coefficient of variation . Let  be a Van Houtum distributed random variable.

 

See also
 Uniform distribution (discrete)

References 

Discrete distributions